Andrew Timothy Giles Thornton (born 1965) is a British philosopher and Professor of Philosophy and Mental Health at the University of Central Lancashire.
He is a Senior Editor of the journal Philosophy, Psychiatry, & Psychology. Thornton is known for his works on philosophy of thought and language.

Books
 Wittgenstein on Language and Thought (EUP 1998)
 John McDowell (Acumen 2004)
 Oxford Textbook of Philosophy and Psychiatry, co-authored with K.W.M. (Bill) Fulford and George Graham (OUP 2006)
Essential Philosophy of Psychiatry (OUP 2007)
 Tacit Knowledge co-authored with Neil Gascoigne (Acumen 2013)
 Oxford Handbook of Philosophy and Psychiatry, edited with Fulford, K.W.M., Davies, M., Gipps, R., Graham, G., Sadler, J., and Stanghellini, (OUP 2014)

References

External links
Tim Thornton at University of Central Lancashire

British philosophers
Philosophy academics
Living people
Academics of the University of Central Lancashire
1965 births
Wittgensteinian philosophers
Alumni of the University of Cambridge